"Try" is the first single from the 2010 Schiller gold album Atemlos with vocals by singer Nadia Ali from New York City. The single was officially released on 9 March 2010 and was peaking at number 58 on German Singles Chart in 2010. The single includes the song ″Salton Sea″. The cover art work shows a photograph of a scene from the music video with Nadia Ali and Christopher von Deylen. The music video was shot in Berlin, Germany.

Track listing

Maxi single

Remixes (Download single)

Credits 

 Producer: Christopher von Deylen
 Vocals by Nadia Ali
 Photography by Philip Glaser

Music video 

The official music video for "Try" was produced by Free The Dragon Filmproduktion GmbH and was shot in late January 2010 in Germany by German director Marcus Sternberg. It has a length of 3:24 minutes. The video features Nadia Ali, Christopher von Deylen, drummer Cliff Hewitt and a male and a female dancer. The music video was shot in the former studios of the CCC Filmkunst in Berlin. It had its world premiere on 19 February 2010 on myvideo.de.

Other crew members:

 Editor: Sebastian Stoffels
 Gaffer: Christian Didi Hupfer
 Assistant production manager: Christoph Sommer

Charts

References

External links
 Official music video of Try
 The music video of Try
 The single on Discogs

Schiller (band) songs
2010 singles
2010 songs
Island Records singles
Songs written by Christopher von Deylen